Westermannia is a genus of moths of the monotypic subfamily Westermanniinae of the family Nolidae. The genus was described by Jacob Hübner in 1821.

Description
Their palpi are slender and closely appressed (flattened down) to the frons, where the third joint is naked and reaching just above vertex of head. Antennae of male almost simple. Thorax and abdomen smoothly scaled. Tibia hairless and spineless. Forewings with nearly rectangular apex. Hindwings with vein 5 from below center of discocellulars.

Species
 Westermannia agrapha Hampson, 1905
 Westermannia anchorita Holland, 1893
 Westermannia antaplagica Draudt, 1950
 Westermannia araeogramma Hampson, 1905
 Westermannia argentata Butler, 1886
 Westermannia argentea Hampson, 1891
 Westermannia argyroplaga Hampson, 1905
 Westermannia brillans Viette, 1965
 Westermannia concha Butler, 1886
 Westermannia convergens Hampson, 1902
 Westermannia cuprea Hampson, 1905
 Westermannia elliptica Bryk, 1913
 Westermannia goodi (Hampson, 1912)
 Westermannia ichneumonis Warren, 1914
 Westermannia immaculata D. S. Fletcher, 1961
 Westermannia interrupta Warren, 1916
 Westermannia jucunda Draudt, 1950
 Westermannia longiplaga Bethune-Baker, 1906
 Westermannia melanoconica Bryk, 1913
 Westermannia metiara Kobes, 1997
 Westermannia monticola Strand, 1913
 Westermannia nobilis Draudt, 1950
 Westermannia oediplaga Hampson, 1910
 Westermannia ossicolor Warren, 1914
 Westermannia poupa Holloway, 1979
 Westermannia pyridimacula Gaede, 1916
 Westermannia roseitincta Pinhey, 1968
 Westermannia semifusca Warren, 1914
 Westermannia superba Hübner, 1823
 Westermannia triangularis Moore, 1877

References

Nolidae